Omloop van het Houtland ("Circuit of Houtland") is a single-day road bicycle race held annually in Lichtervelde in the region of West Flanders, Belgium. Since 2007, the race is organized as a 1.1 event on the UCI Europe Tour.

In 2002 it was held as the first stage of Circuit Franco-Belge.

Winners

External links
 Official Website

References

UCI Europe Tour races
Recurring sporting events established in 1945
1945 establishments in Belgium
Cycle races in Belgium